The Liberal Democratic Party of Pridnestrovie (LDPP) is a nationalist and right-wing populist political party in the breakaway state of Transnistria, recognized as part of Moldova. It was formed on 1 August 2006 by followers of Vladimir Zhirinovsky and is affiliated with the Liberal Democratic Party of Russia. The party leader is Transnistrian politician Valerly Kulakli.

History 
The party already existed from the fall of the Soviet Union as the Transnistrian branch of the Liberal Democratic Party of Russia and was led by the Minister of Local Economy and Transport of the PMR Alexander Saydakov , who was assassinated in 1998.

On 1 August 2006, the regional branch of the LDPR separated from its mother party and became a separate entity, known as Liberal Democratic Party of Pridnestrovie (LDPP).

Notes

References

External links 
 Official website of LDPR Pridnestrovie

Parties affiliated with the Liberal Democratic Party of Russia
Political parties established in 2006
Political parties in Transnistria
Right-wing populist parties
Russian political parties in Moldova